This is a list of the preserved important buildings in Guanajuato City, city of Mexico.

Its mines were so rich that the city was very influential during the colonial period.

The "Historic Town of Guanajuato and Adjacent Mines" is a UNESCO World Heritage Site since 1988.

Colonial

Post-colonial

References

 
Guanajuato

Architecture in Mexico
Mexico
Mexico